Zarafasaura is an extinct genus of elasmosaurid known from the Oulad Abdoun Basin of Morocco.

Description
 
Zarafasaura is known from the holotype OCP-DEK/GE 315, an articulated incomplete dorsoventrally crushed skull and mandible and from the paratype OCP-DEK/GE 456, a complete mandible. The holotype was collected in the Sidi Daoui area, from the Upper CIII level of the upper Cretaceous (latest Maastrichtian stage) Phosphates of Morocco.

Etymology
 
Zarafasaura was first named by Peggy Vincent, Nathalie Bardet, Xabier Pereda Suberbiola, Baâdi Bouya, Mbarek Amaghzaz and Saïd Meslouh in 2011 and the type species is Zarafasaura oceanis. The generic name is derived from zarafa (زرافة), Arabic for "giraffe" (it refers to the name given by the local population to the plesiosaurs found in the phosphates) and saurus, Greek for "lizard". The specific name is derived from oceanis, Latin for "daughter of the sea".

See also

 List of plesiosaur genera
 Timeline of plesiosaur research

References

Late Cretaceous plesiosaurs
Fossil taxa described in 2011
Plesiosaurs of Africa
Elasmosaurids
Sauropterygian genera